From a Low and Quiet Sea is a novel written by Irish novelist Donal Ryan. It was first published in 2018 by Penguin Random House. It was longlisted for the 2018 Man Booker Prize.

References 

2018 Irish novels
Novels by Donal Ryan